Take.1 Are You There? is the first part of the second Korean-language studio album by the South Korean boy group Monsta X. It was released by Starship Entertainment and distributed by Kakao M on October 22, 2018. It consists of ten songs, including the lead single "Shoot Out".

Background and release 
It was released as part one of two of the group's second Korean-language album, with Take.2 We Are Here being the second half of the album. Group members Jooheon and I.M contributed to the song writing and production for much of the album, with members Wonho, Kihyun, and Minhyuk contributing for the song "I Do Love U", alongside them.

"Shoot Out" is a song that represents the worldview for this album, "Light and Dark", "Good and Evil", "Life and Death", and everything on the border. It can be seen as an extended version of the Monsta X worldview that transcends time and space. It also expresses each of the seven deadly sins and shows them wandering in search of salvation.

The physical album was released in four versions.

Critical reception

"Shoot Out" gained praised for its distinct style, particularly Jooheon's and I.M's unique raps. 

The album was praised for its "vicious, energetic, hard-hitting sound" adding "a new sophistication to the menacing side of their discography". Aside from the lead single, Caitlin Kelley of Billboard picked the song "Myself" as the standout track, being on the "softer side of the spectrum".

Listicles

Commercial performance
In September 2021, it became Monsta X's fifth album to be certified platinum by Gaon. The album also charted at number one, two, and nineteen on the weekly, monthly, and yearly Gaon Album Chart, respectively. 

"Shoot Out" charted on Billboard'''s World Digital Song Sales chart upon release, while "I Do Love U" and "Myself" charted in 2020 and 2021, respectively. It had four music show wins, such as The Show, Show Champion, M Countdown, and Music Bank''.

Track listing

Charts

Album

Weekly charts

Monthly chart

Year-end chart

Songs

Weekly charts

Certification and sales

Accolades

Awards and nominations

Release history

See also
 List of K-pop songs on the Billboard charts
 List of K-pop albums on the Billboard charts
 List of K-pop songs on the World Digital Song Sales chart
 List of Gaon Album Chart number ones of 2018

Notes

References

2018 albums
Korean-language albums
Monsta X albums
Starship Entertainment albums